Momento is an album by Brazilian bossa nova singer Bebel Gilberto.

Track listing
 "Momento" - 5:16
 "Bring Back the Love" - 4:29
 "Close to You" - 3:20
 "Os Novos Yorkinos" - 3:41
 "Azul" - 3:13
 "Caçada" - 4:34
 "Night and Day" - 4:57
 "Tranquilo" - 4:06
 "Um Segundo" - 3:12
 "Cadê Você?" - 3:32
 "Words" - 2:30

Weekly charts

In 2011 it was awarded a double silver certification from the Independent Music Companies Association which indicated sales of at least 40,000 copies throughout Europe.

References

Bebel Gilberto albums
2007 albums
Crammed Discs albums